Irlam was launched in 1825 at Liverpool for Barton & Co., which had lost two earlier vessels named Irlam:  in 1812, and  in 1824. The current Irlam was smaller than her predecessors, but was employed in the same trade, Liverpool–Barbados. 

Irlam entered Lloyd's Register in 1826 with D. Campbell, master, Barton & Co., owner, and trade Liverpool–Barbados. Her listing in the Register of Shipping in 1826 has the same information.

In 1831 her master was J. Taylor.

Irlam was wrecked on 11 August 1831 in the Great Barbados Hurricane of 1831. Sixteen vessels, barks, brigs, brigantines, and schooners were driven ashore. Irlam was one of the two barks driven onshore. All the vessels, with the exception of two mail boats and a schooner, were totally lost.

Citations

References
 

1825 ships
Age of Sail merchant ships of England
Maritime incidents in August 1831